Events in the year 2010 in Belgium.

Incumbents
Monarch: Albert II
Prime Minister: Yves Leterme (until 22 April; thereafter as caretaker)

Events

January
 18 January - Pope Benedict XVI accepts the resignation of Godfried Danneels as archbishop of Mechelen-Brussels and appoints André-Joseph Léonard, bishop of Namur, as his successor.
 27 January - A gas explosion destroys a building in the centre of Liège, killing 14 and injuring dozens.

February
 15 February - Halle train collision causes 18 deaths
 27 February - André-Joseph Léonard, bishop of Namur, installed as archbishop of Mechelen-Brussels

April
 22 April - fall of Leterme II Government
 23 April - Pope Benedict XVI accepts the resignation of Roger Vangheluwe as bishop of Bruges after revelations of his sexual abuse of minors
 26 April - Albert II accepts Yves Leterme's resignation as Prime Minister.

May
 31 May - Rémy Vancottem appointed the new bishop of Namur in succession to André-Joseph Léonard

June
 13 June - Belgian federal election, 2010, Yves Leterme remaining head of caretaker government throughout 2010–11 Belgian government formation
 20 June - Rémy Vancottem installed as bishop of Namur
 24 June - judicial police carry out raids at Cardinal Danneels's apartment and the archbishop's palace in Mechelen in a fruitless search for incriminating documents

July
 10 July - Jozef De Kesel installed as bishop of Bruges

August
 29 August - Lewis Hamilton wins the 66th Belgian Grand Prix at the Circuit de Spa-Francorchamps in Spa, Belgium.

October
 21 October - Conclusion of the "Parachute Murder" trial: suspect sentenced to 30 years in prison.

November
 12–13 November - Cyclone Carmen causes flooding

Deaths
 2 January - René Oreel (87), racing cyclist
 6 February - Ernest van der Eyken (96), composer, conductor and violist
 7 February - Jean-Marie Buisset (71), Olympic bobsledder and field hockey player
 9 February - Davy Coenen (29), mountain biker
 22 February - Fred Chaffart (74), businessman
 27 February - Frans De Blaes (100), Olympic sprint canoer
 22 April - Ann Vervoort (33), singer in Milk Inc.
 17 May - Bobbejaan Schoepen (85), singer-songwriter and entrepreneur
 27 July - André Geerts (54), cartoonist (French)
 21 August - Chloé Graftiaux (23), rock climber
 28 August - Daniel Ducarme (56), former Minister-President of the Brussels Capital-Region
 16 September - Berni Collas (56), member of the Belgian Senate
 20 September - Fud Leclerc (86), singer
 14 October - Alain Le Bussy (63), science fiction author
 1 November - Gaston Vandermeerssche (89), Belgian partisan (subject of Gaston's War)
 4 November - Antoine Duquesne (69), politician
 9 November - Herman Liebaers (91), linguist
 13 November - Richard Van Genechten (80), cyclist
 10 December - Jacques Swaters (84), racing driver
 19 December - Lucien Mathys (86), cyclist.
 31 December - Raymond Impanis (85), cyclist

See also
2010 in Belgian television

References

 
Belgium
Years of the 21st century in Belgium
2010s in Belgium
Belgium